Čedomir Tomčić (born 20 April 1987) is a Serbian football midfielder who plays for FK Bečej.

References

External links
 
 Čedomir Tomčić stats at utakmica.rs

1987 births
Living people
Footballers from Novi Sad
Association football midfielders
Serbian footballers
FK Inđija players
FK Javor Ivanjica players
Serbian SuperLiga players
Serbian expatriate footballers
Expatriate footballers in Armenia
Serbian expatriate sportspeople in Armenia
FC Ararat Yerevan players
Armenian Premier League players
FK Proleter Novi Sad players
FK Cement Beočin players
OFK Bačka players